

Paleozoology

Molluscs

New bivalves

Conodont paleozoology

Vertebrate paleozoology

Fish

New Actinopterygii ("ray-finned fish")

Archosauromorphs

Newly named crurotarsans

Newly named dinosaurs 
Data courtesy of George Olshevsky's dinosaur genera list.

Newly named birds

New Pterosaurs

Synapsid

Mammals

Paleontologists
 Death of Friedrich von Huene, the well known German paleontologist.

References

 
Paleontology
Paleontology 9